The 1923 Georgia Tech Golden Tornado football team represented the Georgia Tech Golden Tornado of the Georgia Institute of Technology during the 1923 college football season. Tech had ties in every one of its conference games.

Before the season
Tech used a starting backfield, including sophomore Doug Wycoff, and a "pony backfield" full of smaller, fast substitutes such as Jerry Albright and Frank Harris.

Schedule

Season summary

Week 1: Oglethorpe

Oglethorpe led at the half on Tech, but Tech came back to win 28–13.

The starting lineup was: Staton (left end), Carpenter (left tackle), McIntyre (left guard), Frye (center), McConnell (right guard), Usry (right tackle), Gardner (right end), Carter (quarterback), Hunt (left halfback), Reeves (right halfback), Wycoff (fullback).

Week 2: VMI
Tech beat VMI 10–7. Both teams touchdowns came on interceptions. The starting lineup was: Staton (left end), Merkle (left tackle), McConnell (left guard), Frye (center), McIntyre (right guard), Usry (right tackle), Gardner (right end), I. Williams (quarterback), Hunt (left halfback), Reeves (right halfback), Wycoff (fullback).

Week 3: Florida

The game with the Florida Gators brought considerable interest. In front of 12,000 at Grant Field, the Gators were up 7 to 0 until a rush of substitutes in the fourth quarter got the Yellow Jackets the tying score.

The starting lineup was: Staton (left end), Merkle (left tackle), McIntyre (left guard), Frye (center), McConnell (right guard), Usry (right tackle), Gardner (right end), Carter (quarterback), Hunt (left halfback), Farnsworth (right halfback), Wycoff (fullback).

Week 4: Georgetown

Georgetown led 10–0 at the half, but Tech won 20–10. The starting lineup was: Staton (left end), Merkle (left tackle), McIntyre (left guard), Frye (center), McConnell (right guard), Huffines (right tackle), Gardner (right end), Hunt (quarterback), Williams (left halfback), Reeves (right halfback), Wycoff (fullback).

Week 5: at Notre Dame

Rockne's Notre Dame Fighting Irish subs ran up a 35–7 score. Over 20,000 fans were in attendance. The starting lineup was: Staton (left end), Merrin (left tackle), McIntyre (left guard), Frye (center), McConnell (right guard), Huffines (right tackle), Gardner (right end), Hunt (quarterback), Albright (left halfback), Reeves (right halfback), Wycoff (fullback)

Week 6: Alabama 

In a driving rain, Tech and Alabama under first year coach Wallace Wade played to a scoreless tie.

Week 7: at Penn State

Penn State beat Georgia Tech 7–0. The Atlanta Constitution's Paul Warwick protested "these eastern and western invasions."

The starting lineup was: Staton (left end), Usry (left tackle), McIntyre (left guard), Frye (center), McConnell (right guard), Huffines (right tackle), Gardner (right end), Davis (quarterback), Williams (left halfback), Reeves (right halfback), Wycoff (fullback).

Week 8: Kentucky
Tech used every backfield man in a 3–3 tie to Kentucky.

Week 9: Auburn

In awfully muddy conditions, Auburn and Tech fought to a scoreless tie.

Postseason
Tech had its worst season in years.

Personnel

Depth chart
The following chart provides a visual depiction of Tech's lineup during the 1923 season with games started at the position reflected in parenthesis. The chart mimics the offense after the jump shift has taken place.

Notes

Endnotes

References
 
 

Georgia Tech
Georgia Tech Yellow Jackets football seasons
Georgia Tech Golden Tornado football
1920s in Atlanta